The rufous-headed tailorbird (Phyllergates heterolaemus) is a species of bird in the family Cettiidae.
It is found only in the Philippines.
Its natural habitats are subtropical or tropical moist lowland forest and subtropical or tropical moist montane forest.

References

rufous-headed tailorbird
Birds of Mindanao
rufous-headed tailorbird
Taxonomy articles created by Polbot